Vydrná is a village and municipality in Púchov District in the Trenčín Region of north-western Slovakia.

History
In historical records the village was first mentioned in 1475.

Geography
The municipality lies at an altitude of 345 metres and covers an area of 13.439 km2. It has a population of about 350 people.

External links
 
 
https://web.archive.org/web/20070513023228/http://www.statistics.sk/mosmis/eng/run.html

Villages and municipalities in Púchov District